Lead Run is a tributary of East Branch Fishing Creek in Sullivan County, Pennsylvania. The stream has a low pH and poor water quality, although that could potentially be remedied. The main rock formations in the area are the Catskill Formation, the Huntley Mountain Formation, and the Burgoon Sandstone. The main soil associations in the vicinity of the stream are the Deep-Wellsboro-Oquaga association, the Norwich association, and the Oquaga association.

Course

Lead Run begins in on a plateau in eastern Davidson Township. It flows west-northwest for approximately  before turning southwest and heading into a steep ravine, where it stays for more than a mile. Near its mouth, the stream leaves the ravine and turns south and then east. It then reaches its confluence with East Branch Fishing Creek.

Tributaries
Lead Run has no named tributaries. However, it does have a number of unnamed tributaries.

Hydrology
The average discharge of Lead Run is 821 gallons per minute. However, it occasionally runs dry for a period of time, especially during the summer. The average pH of the stream is 4.44. The average concentration of aluminum in the stream is 0.301 milligrams per liter.

The stream experiences chronic acidification.

The water quality of Lead Run is considered to be "severe", a rating worse than "very poor". The stream also degrades the water quality of East Branch Fishing Creek, although it is not a major contributor of acidity to the creek. Road liming has been suggested as a method of making Lead Run more alkaline. The cost of road liming Lead Run along with the nearby Trout Run is estimated to be $120,000. This restoration is the seventh and final phase of the restoration plan of East Branch Fishing Creek.

The cause of the impairment is atmospheric deposition and metals.

Geography and geology

The lower reaches of Lead Run lie over rock of the Catskill Formation. The middle portion of the stream is on rock of the Huntley Mountain Formation. The stream's headwaters are on Burgoon Sandstone.

Much of Lead Run is over soil of the Deep-Wellsboro-Oquaga soil association. However, the upper reaches of the watershed are on soil of the Norwich and Oquaga soil associations. Most of the soil in the watershed is strongly acidic. There are also some rock outcroppings near the stream.

Watershed

Most of Lead Run is located along private lands. However, a number of forest trails run parallel to and cross the stream.

History
The Pennsylvania Department of Environmental Protection listed Lead Run as impaired in 2002. As of December 2011, a total maximum daily load is planned for the stream in 2015.

See also
Heberly Run
List of tributaries of Fishing Creek (North Branch Susquehanna River)

References

Rivers of Sullivan County, Pennsylvania
Tributaries of Fishing Creek (North Branch Susquehanna River)
Rivers of Pennsylvania